Dwan Jacobsen Young (born May 1, 1931) was the seventh general president of the Primary organization of the Church of Jesus Christ of Latter-day Saints (LDS Church) from 1980 to 1988.

Biography 

Dwan Jacobsen was born in Salt Lake City, Utah.  She graduated from South High School (Salt Lake City) in 1948 and later graduated from the University of Utah with a Bachelor of Education.  She married Thomas Young, Jr. and they are the parents of five children.

Young became a member of the Primary general board 1970.  Ten years later, she was selected to succeed Naomi M. Shumway as the organization's general president.  Young served in this capacity until 1988, when her second counselor, Michaelene P. Grassli, was chosen to succeed her.  During Young's tenure, Primary changed from a weekday activity to one that was incorporated into the LDS Church's three-hour consolidated worship services.

Upon her release, Young accompanied her husband to Canada, where he served as president of the church's Canada Calgary Mission.

In 1990, Young was awarded the Silver Buffalo Award from the Boy Scouts of America for her work to incorporate Cub Scouting into the LDS Church's Primary program.

See also
List of recipients of the Silver Buffalo Award

References 

 Arnold K. Garr, Donald Q. Cannon & Richard O. Cowan (eds.) (2000).  Encyclopedia of Latter-day Saint History (Salt Lake City, Utah: Deseret Book)
 “New Primary Presidency Sustained,” Ensign, May 1980, p. 106

1931 births
American Mormon missionaries in Canada
Female Mormon missionaries
General Presidents of the Primary (LDS Church)
Living people
People from Salt Lake City
University of Utah alumni
Richards–Young family
20th-century Mormon missionaries
Mission presidents (LDS Church)
American leaders of the Church of Jesus Christ of Latter-day Saints
Latter Day Saints from Utah